Ralph Peter Hatendi  DD AKC (9 April 192731 August 2018) was a Zimbabwean bishop of Harare and Mashonaland from 1979 to his reluctant retirement in 1995. He later came out of retirement to serve as Interim Bishop of Manicaland from 2008 until 2009, when his son-in-law was elected to the See. In 1964/65 he was the local Vicar in the UK Lincolnshire village of Tetford.

History
He was born on 9 April 1927 and educated at St Peter's College, Rosettenville and King's College London.  He was ordained in 1958 and began his career as a Curate in  Bonda after which he was Chaplain to the Bernard Mizeki Mission in Marandellas and then a Lecturer at St John's Seminary in Lusaka.

References

1927 births
2018 deaths
Alumni of King's College London
Associates of King's College London
Anglican bishops of Harare and Mashonaland
20th-century Anglican bishops in Africa
People educated at St Peter’s College, Rosettenville